Actions on Google is a development platform for the Google Assistant. It allows the third-party development of "actions"—applets for the Google Assistant that provide extended functionality.

Interface
The actions platform supports "direct" actions, as well as "conversational" actions for more complex applications. More advanced developers are able to develop directly against the API, and a SDK for Node.js is also available.

As of April 2017 there were more than 175 Actions for Google Assistant, including ones from Uber, The Motley Fool, NPR One, NBC News, and Domino's Pizza. The availability was further extended beyond the Google Home space into Android and iOS.

References

External links
Official Website

Web development software
Natural language processing software
Software developer communities
Google software